Blue Eyes (original title Blå ögon) is a Swedish political drama television series created by Alex Haridi. The programme focuses on two female leads against the backdrop of the rise of a far right political party, Trygghetspartiet

Haridi's inspiration for the show came from election gains made by the Swedish Democrats and from shows such as The Wire and Homeland. The show was a ratings success, attracting over 1 million viewers in Sweden.

Critics considered the Security Party to be too similar to the Swedish Democrats, leading to complaints to the broadcasting regulator.

As Blue Eyes – and with English subtitles – the series was available on demand from Channel 4 TV as part of its Walter Presents service and occupied the Friday 9pm slot on Channel 4's More 4 channel during April and May 2016. It was also broadcast in Australia on SBS.  The series was released on home video (DVD and Blu-ray) in Sweden in 2015, and on DVD in the United Kingdom.

References

External links

Swedish crime television series
2014 Swedish television series debuts